Nicola Cornick (born 1964 in Bradford Yorkshire, England) is a British writer of historical romance novels and more recently, timeslip mysteries that merge multiple genres, including historical fiction, romance, suspense, adventure, crime, science fiction/fantasy and the supernatural. Her books have been translated into over 40 languages and she has won a number of awards.She is also a historian specialising in public history. She acts as a volunteer guide and historian at Ashdown House, a 17th-century National Trust hunting lodge in Oxfordshire and is a trustee of the Friends of Lydiard Park, Swindon and of the Wantage Literary Festival.

Nicola Cornick was elected the twenty-eight chair (2017–2019) of the Romantic Novelists' Association, and is a member of the Society of Authors and the Historical Writers' Association. She is a speaker on various writing and history-related topics and is RNA archivist.

Biography
Nicola Cornick was born in Yorkshire, England. She obtained an honours degree in Medieval History from London University. She worked for many years in university administration, becoming Assistant Academic Registrar and Operations Manager at Cranfield University. She returned to college in Oxford, to study at Ruskin College. gaining a master's degree with distinction in Public History.

She published her first novel in 1998 for Mills & Boon (reedited as Harlequin Enterprises in USA), specializing in romances set in the British Regency. In 2006 she moved to HQN Books in the United States and published longer historical romances with settings ranging from 19th century Scotland to the Arctic. In 2014 she signed with Harper Collins HQ to write highly acclaimed multiple time period historical mysteries.

Nicola Cornick's books have been shortlisted for a number of awards including the Romance Writers of America RITA Awards and the RNA awards, and have won the Reader's Choice Award, the Laurel Wreath and the LORIES. She has been Wiltshire Libraries Writer in Residence and has spoken at the Oxford Literary Festival on the history and development of the romance novel and at Sharjah International Book Fair on the appeal of the historical novel. Her works are recognised for their historical research and well-observed characterisation.

She lives in Oxfordshire, England.

Traditional Regencies

True Colours (1998)
The Virtuous Cyprian (1998)
The Larkswood Legacy (1999)
Lady Polly (1999)
Miss Verey's Proposal (2000)
Lady Allerton's Wager (2000)
The Notorious Marriage (2002)
The Earl's Prize (2002)
The Chaperon Bride (2003)
Wayward Widow (2003)
The Blanchland Secret (2000)
The Penniless Bride (2003)
Lord Greville's Captive (2006)
The Last Rake in London (2008)
Kidnapped (2009)

Blue Stocking Brides Series
The Notorious Lord (2004)
One Night of Scandal (2004)
The Rake's Mistress (2004)

Regency historicals

Deceived (2006)
Lord of Scandal (2007)
Unmasked (2008)

The Brides of Fortune Series
The Secrets of a Courtesan (2009)
The Confessions of a Duchess (2009)
The Scandals of An Innocent (2009)
The Undoing of a Lady (2009)

Scandalous Women of the Ton Series
Whisper of Scandal (2010)
One Wicked Sin (2010)
Mistress by Midnight (2010)
Notorious (2011)
Desired (2011)
Forbidden (2012)

The Scottish Brides
The Lady and the Laird (2013)
One night with the Laird (2013)
Claimed by the Laird (2014)

Multi Period Historical
House of Shadows (2015)
The Phantom Tree (2016)
The Woman in the Lake (2019)
The Forgotten Sister (2020)
The Last Daughter (2021)

Collaborations

Steepwood Scandal Series Multi-Author
4. A Companion of Quality (2001)
14. An Unlikely Suitor (2002)

Anthologies in collaboration
"The Rake's Bride" in Regency Brides (2002) (with Anne Gracie and Gayle Wilson)
"The Season for Suitors" in Christmas Keepsakes (2005) (with Mary Balogh and Julia Justiss)
"The Fortune Hunter· in A Regency Invitation (2005) (with Joanna Maitland and Elizabeth Rolls)
"The Pirate's Kiss" in Regency Christmas Weddings (2007) (with Miranda Jarrett and Margaret McPhee)
"The Unmasking of Lady Loveless" in Together by Christmas (2009) (with Louise Allen and Catherine George)
"The Elopement" in Love Me, Loves Me Not" (2010) (with several authors)"On a Wicked Winter's Night in Mischief and Mistletoe (2012) (with several authors)"The Marriage Bargain in Truly, Madly, Deeply (2014) (with several authors)"A Season for Marriage in The Last Chance Christmas Ball'' (2014) (with several authors)

References

Sources

Author page on UK Publisher site

1964 births
Living people
English romantic fiction writers
Writers from Bradford
Alumni of the University of London
Alumni of Ruskin College